The following is a list of notable events and releases of the year 2006 in Norwegian music.

Events

January
 13 – The very first Ice Music Festival Festival started in Geilo, Norway (January 13–15).
 26 – The 9th Polarjazz Festival started in Longyearbyen, Svalbard (January 26–28).

February
 2 – Kristiansund Opera Festival opened (February 2–18).

March

April
 7
 The 33rd Vossajazz started at Voss (April 7 – 9).
 Yngve Moe was awarded Vossajazzprisen 2006.
 8 – Trygve Seim performs the commissioned work Reiser for Vossajazz 2006.
 28 –  Bergenfest started in Bergen (April 28 – May 6).

May
 24
The start of Bergen International Music Festival Festspillene i Bergen (May 24 – June 5).
 The 34th Nattjazz started in Bergen (May 24 – June 3).

June
 14 – Norwegian Wood started in Oslo (June 14 – 18).

July
 17 – The 46th Moldejazz started in Molde (July 17 – 22).

August
 9 – The 20th Sildajazz started in Haugesund (August 9 – 13).
 13 – The 21st Oslo Jazzfestival started in Oslo (August 13 – 19).
 24 – The 2nd Punktfestivalen started in Kristiansand (August 24–26).

September 
 13 – The DølaJazz started in Lillehammer (September 13 – 16).
 28 – The 28th Ultima Oslo Contemporary Music Festival opened in Oslo (September 28 – Oktober 14).

October 
 11 – The 5th Insomnia Festival started in Tromsø (October 11 – 14).
 31 – The Oslo World Music Festival started in Oslo (October 31 – November 5).

November 
 8 – The 1st Barents Jazz, Tromsø International Jazz Festival started (November 8 – 12).

December 
 11 – The Nobel Peace Prize Concert was held at Telenor Arena.

Albums released

February

Unknown date

K
 Karin Krog
 Together Again (Grappa Music), with Steve Kuhn

Deaths

January
 23 – Olga Marie Mikalsen, singer (born 1915).

March
 13 – Arne Dørumsgaard (84), composer and poet (born 1921).

September
 3
 Eva Knardahl, classical pianist (born 1927).
 Lasse Myrvold (53), musician (born 1953).
 4 – Ingrid Bjoner, opera singer (born 1927).
 28 – Jan Werner Danielsen, singer (born 1976).

December
 24 — Kenneth Sivertsen, composer and guitarist (born 1961).

Births

January
 10 – Angelina Jordan, jazz singer.

See also
 2006 in Norway
 Music of Norway
 Norway in the Eurovision Song Contest 2006
 2006 in Swiss music

References

 
Norwegian music
Norwegian
Music
2000s in Norwegian music